Mary Cholhok Nuba also spelled as Mary Cholhock Nuba who is also simply known either as Mary Cholhok or Mary Nuba (born 3 January 1997) is a South Sudanese born professional Ugandan netball player who plays for Loughborough Lightning in the British Netball Superleague and for the Uganda Netball team as the GS.

Career

School career
She attended St. Mary's High School  where she represented it in national School Championships between 2013 and 2016.

NIC 
In 2017, Mary joined NIC Netball Club. She played for NIC Netball Club from 2017 to 2018.

Loughbourgh University
In December 2018, Mary joined Loughbourgh University. She made her debut in Loughborough Lightning's first league game against Wasps on 5 January 2019 at the Arena Birmingham.

National team
Mary made her debut for the Uganda national netball team during the World University games which took place in Kampala, she played against United States.She has also represented Uganda in the 2019 Netball World Cup in England. 
In September 2019, she was included in the Ugandan squad for the 2019 African Netball Championships.

Honors
 Topscorer in National Netball Championship : 2016
 Topscorer in World University Games : 1: 2018
 Topscorer in Netball Superleague: 2: 2019, 2021
 The Coveted Golden Shot Award for 3 consecution years

References

External links
 Profile at Netball World Cup

1997 births
Living people
Ugandan netball players
Nkumba University alumni
Alumni of Loughborough University
People from Arua District
People from West Nile sub-region
People from Northern Region, Uganda
Netball Superleague players
2019 Netball World Cup players
Ugandan expatriate sportspeople in England
Loughborough Lightning netball players
Expatriate netball people in England